Goran "Maza" Vasilijević (born 27 August 1965) is a Serbian former professional footballer who played as a defender.

Career
After playing for Zemun and Radnički Niš, Vasilijević joined Red Star Belgrade in the summer of 1988. He was a member of the team that won the European Cup in 1991. In the mid-1990s, Vasilijević also played abroad in Bulgaria and Japan.

In 2002, Vasilijević briefly served as manager of Obilić.

Honours
Red Star Belgrade
 Yugoslav First League: 1990–91, 1991–92
 FR Yugoslavia Cup: 1992–93
 European Cup: 1990–91
 Intercontinental Cup: 1991

References

External links
 
 
 

Association football defenders
First Professional Football League (Bulgaria) players
Expatriate footballers in Bulgaria
Expatriate footballers in Japan
FC Lokomotiv 1929 Sofia players
First League of Serbia and Montenegro players
FK Borac Čačak players
FK Napredak Kruševac players
FK Obilić managers
FK Radnički Niš players
FK Zemun players
J1 League players
JEF United Chiba players
People from Zemun
Red Star Belgrade footballers
Serbia and Montenegro expatriate footballers
Serbia and Montenegro expatriate sportspeople in Bulgaria
Serbia and Montenegro expatriate sportspeople in Japan
Serbia and Montenegro football managers
Serbia and Montenegro footballers
Serbian footballers
Yugoslav First League players
Yugoslav footballers
Yugoslavia under-21 international footballers
1965 births
Living people